Petter Normann Rudi (born 17 September 1973) is a retired Norwegian footballer. He finished his career at Belgian club K.A.A. Gent in 2007 after playing professionally in several countries in Europe during his career.

Club career
As midfielder, Rudi has played with several European clubs. These are K.A.A. Gent, A.C. Perugia, Sheffield Wednesday, Lokeren, Germinal Beerschot, Austria Wien and Molde FK.

Molde
17 years old, Rudi became part of Molde's senior squad in the 1991 season. He got his debut on 12 May 1991 in a league game the club drew 1–1 against Fyllingen. Rudi scored his first goals for Molde on 16 August 1992, when he scored a brace against Mjøndalen in Molde's 4–0 win at Nedre Eiker Stadion. Molde were relegated from the top division in 1993, but Rudi played all games in the following season and contributed to Molde being promoted back to Tippeligaen. Rudi was suspended in the final of the 1994 Norwegian Cup where Molde defeated Lyn 3–2 and won the club's first major trophy.

Sheffield Wednesday
Petter Rudi was signed by David Pleat in October 1997 from Molde FK. He made his debut against Spurs, and his style of play made him popular with the Wednesday fans. Rudi became a regular starter under Ron Atkinson later that season after Pleat was sacked. The Norwegian failed to score in his first season, he did however score in the 5–3 penalty shoot-out victory against Watford in the 3rd round of the FA Cup.

Rudi made 79 and 6 sub appearances for Wednesday scoring 8 goals.

International career
Rudi played a total of 52 games and scored 9 goals for Norway at international youth level.

During has career, Rudi has been capped 46 times for the Norway national football team scoring three goals.

Career statistics

Club
Source:

International
Source:

Honours
Molde
Norwegian Cup: 1994, 2005

Austria Wien
Austrian Football Bundesliga: 2003–04

References

Sources
http://www.national-football-teams.com/v2/player.php?id=5072

1973 births
Living people
Norwegian footballers
Norway under-21 international footballers
Norway youth international footballers
Norway international footballers
Norwegian expatriate footballers
K.A.A. Gent players
A.C. Perugia Calcio players
Sheffield Wednesday F.C. players
K.S.C. Lokeren Oost-Vlaanderen players
FK Austria Wien players
Molde FK players
Expatriate footballers in Belgium
Expatriate footballers in Italy
Expatriate footballers in England
Expatriate footballers in Austria
Norwegian expatriate sportspeople in Belgium
Norwegian expatriate sportspeople in Italy
Norwegian expatriate sportspeople in England
Norwegian expatriate sportspeople in Austria
Sportspeople from Kristiansund
People from Molde
Premier League players
Eliteserien players
Norwegian First Division players
Belgian Pro League players
Austrian Football Bundesliga players
Serie A players
Association football midfielders
Molde FK non-playing staff